Ulrome is a village and civil parish in the East Riding of Yorkshire, England. The parish includes the village of Lissett.

The parish church of St Andrew is a Grade II listed building.

Civil parish 
Although the civil parish is called "Ulrome" its parish council is called "Lissett & Ulrome Parish Council". On 1 April 1935 Lissett parish was abolished and merged with Ulrome, the parish also gained part of Barmston.

Cables from the offshore 2.4 GW Dogger Bank Wind Farm make landfall to the north of Ulrome.

References

External links

Villages in the East Riding of Yorkshire
Civil parishes in the East Riding of Yorkshire